Frederick and Augusta Hagemann Farm is a historic home and farm located in Black Township, Posey County, Indiana.  The farmhouse was built about 1895, and is a -story, asymmetrical, Queen Anne style brick dwelling. It has limestone and wood detailing and features a projecting gable and wraparound porch with concrete block piers and a semi-octagonal corner. Also on the property are the contributing large frame barn (c. 1895), a smokehouse / privy (c. 1895), and a garage (c. 1925).

It was listed on the National Register of Historic Places in 1993.

References

Farms on the National Register of Historic Places in Indiana
Houses completed in 1895
Queen Anne architecture in Indiana
Houses in Posey County, Indiana
National Register of Historic Places in Posey County, Indiana